Hotel Fauchere and Annex is a historic hotel located at Milford, Pike County, Pennsylvania.  The main building was built in 1880, and is a three-story, square, wood-frame building in the Italianate style.  It is six bays wide, has a flat roof, and a one-story porch.  The annex was built in 1905, and was originally a private home.  The rectangular Queen Anne style building was purchased in 1907 by the hotel.

It was added to the National Register of Historic Places in 1980.

References

External links

Hotel Fauchere website

Hotel buildings on the National Register of Historic Places in Pennsylvania
Hotel buildings completed in 1880
Buildings and structures in Pike County, Pennsylvania
1880 establishments in Pennsylvania
National Register of Historic Places in Pike County, Pennsylvania